Granze is a comune (municipality) in the Province of Padua in the Italian region Veneto, located about  southwest of Venice and about  southwest of Padua.

Granze borders the following municipalities: Sant'Elena, Sant'Urbano, Solesino, Stanghella, Vescovana, Villa Estense.

Demographic evolution

References

Cities and towns in Veneto